Idomene may refer to:
 Idomeni, a town in Greece near the border with the Republic of North Macedonia
 Idomenae, a town of ancient Macedonia, now in the Republic of North Macedonia
 Idomene (Ambracia), a location or mountains near Amphilochian Argos
Battle of Idomene, fought there